People who served as the mayor of the Municipality of Waterloo are:

References

Mayors Waterloo
Waterloo, Mayors
Mayors of Waterloo